The Polytechnic, Ile-Ife, formerly Universal Turorial College, is a private-owned tertiary institution located in the ancient city of Ile Ife, Osun State. Founded in 1984 by Rahmon Adedoyin, the polytechnic is recognized by the National Board for Technical Education after it was accredited in 2009. The Polytechnic, Ile-Ife offers National Diploma and Higher National Diploma courses at undergraduate levels.

See also
 List of polytechnics in Nigeria

References

External links
 
 Official website

Universities and colleges in Nigeria
Ife
1984 establishments in Nigeria
Educational institutions established in 1984